Lama is a surname. Notable people with the surname include:

 Alfred A. Lama (1899-1984), Italian-born American architect and politician. 
 Bernard Lama (born 1963), French football coach and former goalkeeper
 Kieran Lama, Australian drummer and manager of Spacey Jane
 Manolo Lama (born 1962), Spanish radio sportscaster
 Serge Lama (born 1943), French singer
 Sofía Lama (born 1987), Mexican actress
 Manuel Tarrazo Lama (born 1989), Dominican shoe designer, TV presenter and actor.